Zieria minutiflora, commonly known as twiggy zieria, is a plant in the citrus family Rutaceae and is endemic to eastern Australia. It is a small, erect, twiggy shrub with leaves composed of three leaflets, and clusters of small white flowers with four petals and four stamens. It usually grows as an understorey shrub in eucalypt woodland.

Description
The branches are hairy at first but become glabrous with age. The upper surface of the leaves has scattered hairs and the lower surface is covered with soft hairs. The leaflets have a rounded or sometimes a notched end .

The flowers are white to pale pink or cream-coloured and are arranged singly or in groups of up to three in leaf axils. The groups are shorter than the leaves. In common with other zierias there are only four stamens. Flowering occurs from November to May and is followed by fruit which is a glabrous follicle composed of up to four sections joined at the base and which burst open to release their seeds when ripe.

Taxonomy and naming
Zieria minutiflora was first formally described in 1926 by Karel Domin from a specimen collected near the Glasshouse Mountains. (The species was first described by Ferdinand von Mueller as Boronia minutiflora but the name was not validly published.) The specific epithet (minutiflora) is derived from the Latin words minutus meaning "little" or "small" and flora meaning "flowers".

Two subspecies have been described:
Zieria minutiflora  Dominsubsp. minutiflora which has a glabrous ovary and fruit;
Zieria minutiflora subsp. trichocarpa J.A.Armstr.  which has a hairy ovary and fruit and only occurs in Queensland.

Distribution and habitat
Twiggy zieria mainly occurs north from Coffs Harbour in New South Wales and as far north in Queensland as Danbulla National Park and State Forest on the Atherton Tableland. It usually grows in eucalypt forest and woodland but also occurs in rocky coastal areas.

References

minutiflora
Sapindales of Australia
Flora of New South Wales
Flora of Queensland
Plants described in 1926